Qeshlaq-e Mohammad Beyg-e Sofla (also Romanized as Qeshlāq-e Moḩammad Beyg-e Soflá; also known as Qeshlāq-e Moḩammad Beyk-e Soflá and Qeshlaq-e Mohammad Beyk-e Pain - , also Romanized as Qeshlāq-e Moḩammad Beyk-e Pā’īn) is a village in Hir Rural District, in the Hir District of Ardabil County, Ardabil Province, Iran. At the 2006 census, its population was 23 in 4 families.

References 

Towns and villages in Ardabil County